The 2015 Volta a Catalunya was the 95th edition of the Volta a Catalunya stage race. It took place from 23 to 29 March and was the fifth race of the 2015 UCI World Tour. Defending champion Joaquim Rodríguez was scheduled to defend his title, but was pulled from the event days before it was due to start citing a stomach virus. The race was won by Richie Porte, his second race win of the season, with Alejandro Valverde in second and Domenico Pozzovivo in third.

Route

Participating teams 
The Volta a Catalunya is part of the UCI World Tour, which meant that the 17 UCI WorldTeams were automatically invited and obliged to send a team. The race organisers also made seven wildcard invitations to UCI Professional Continental teams. The peloton was therefore made up of 24 teams.

Stages

Stage 1 
23 March 2015 — Calella to Calella,

Stage 2 
24 March 2015 — Mataró to Olot,

Stage 3 
25 March 2015 — Girona to Girona,

Stage 4 
26 March 2015 — Tona to La Molina,

Stage 5 
27 March 2015 — Alp to Valls,

Stage 6 
28 March 2015 — Cervera to PortAventura,

Stage 7 
29 March 2015 — Barcelona to Barcelona,

Classification leadership table 
In the 2015 Volta a Catalunya, four different jerseys were awarded. For the general classification, calculated by adding each cyclist's finishing times on each stage, and allowing time bonuses in intermediate sprints (3, 2 and 1 seconds) and at the finish in mass-start stages (10, 6 and 4 seconds respectively for the first three finishers), the leader received a white and green jersey. This classification was considered the most important of the 2015 Volta a Catalunya, and the winner of the classification was considered the winner of the race.

Additionally, there was a sprints classification, which awarded a white jersey. In the sprints classification, cyclists received points for finishing in the top 3 at intermediate sprint points during each stage; these intermediate sprints also offered bonus seconds towards the general classification.  There was also a mountains classification, the leadership of which was marked by a red jersey. In the mountains classification, points were won by reaching the top of a climb before other cyclists, with more points available for the higher-categorised climbs.

There was also a classification for teams, in which the times of the best three cyclists per team on each stage were added together; the leading team at the end of the race was the team with the lowest total time.

Notes

References

External links 

Volta a Catalunya by year
Volta a Catalunya
Volta a Catalunya
Volta a Catalunya
March 2015 sports events in Spain